"Looking for an Echo" is a doo-wop song written by Richard Reicheg.  There have been several popular versions of the song recorded, including:

The original version by Kenny Vance, first released as an Atlantic records single in 1975.  This version also appeared on Vance's album Vance 32.
An a cappella version by The Persuasions, on their 1977 album Chirpin' (Elektra LP 7E-1099).

Ol' 55 version

Australian band Ol' 55 released a version of "Looking for an Echo" as the second and final single from their debut studio album Take It Greasy (1976). The song peaked at number 9, becoming the band's first top ten single.

Track listing
 7" (K-6504)
Side A	"Looking for an Echo" - 3:16
Side B "Doin' Fine" - 2:38

Charts

Weekly charts

Year-end charts

References

Doo-wop songs
1976 singles
Ol' 55 (band) songs
1976 songs
Mushroom Records singles
Songs written by Richard Reicheg